"C'est Bleu" is a single by German hard dance band Scooter. It was released on 2 December 2011 as the fourth single from their fifteenth studio album The Big Mash Up.

The song samples L'amour est bleu, a Vicky Leandros song from 1967.

Track listing 

CD Single (2-track)

Download

Danish Promo CD Single

Chart performance

References

External links
 Scooter Official website

Scooter (band) songs
2011 singles
Songs written by H.P. Baxxter
Songs written by Rick J. Jordan
Songs written by Jens Thele
Songs written by Michael Simon (DJ)
2011 songs
Songs written by André Popp
Songs written by Pierre Cour